The 1921 Saint Mary's Saints football team was an American football team that represented Saint Mary's College of California during the 1921 college football season.  In their first season under head coach Slip Madigan, the Gaels compiled a 4–3 record and  outscored their opponents by a combined total of 155 to 70.

Madigan was hired as Saint Mary's head football coach in January 1921. He played center for the Notre Dame football team from 1916 to 1919 and was the football coach at Columbia College in 1920. He remained the coach at St. Mary's for 19 years through the 1939 season.

Schedule

References

Saint Mary's Saints
Saint Mary's Gaels football seasons
Saint Mary's Saints football